Paul Ronald Johan Meijer (born 27 March 1985 in Utrecht) is a Dutch racing driver. He is a former Benelux Formula Renault champion.

Career
As many formula drivers, Paul started his career in karting at the age of 10. He participated in national and international competitions.

In 2001 Paul participated in a Challenge organized by Avaya Communications, with 7 candidates.
He won the Challenge and earned a season driving in the first Dutch Toyota Yaris Cup for free.

The ex Formula One racing driver Jan Lammers took Paul into the Formula Ford in 2002.
With Racing for Holland Paul learned the essentials about driving a formula racing car and participated in the Benelux Formula Ford Championship. During this education Paul also tested the DOME S101 sportcar at Magny Cours.

In 2003, he won the Benelux Formula Renault 2.0 with AR Motorsport. He also debuted in the European Championship of this serie. As Dutch Champion a test is offered him in the Formula Renault V6. Later that year he also tested with Fortec in a Formula 3 car at Silverstone.

The Italian team Vergani Racing invited Paul into the World Serie light by Nissan. In November that year he tested at the circuits of Albecete and Jarama and on both occasions he drove the fastest laps of the day. The team invited Paul for the final race weekend, where he finished third.

In 2004 Meijer entered the strong competition of the Eurocup Formula Renault 2.0. With his team AR Motorsport he became 6th in the Championship and finished 3 times second, 3 times fourth and 2 times fifth.

At the side he participated also in the Benelux Formula Renault 2.0 Championship  and could only drive 7 out 12 races. He finished 6 times first and 1 time second.

In 2005 and 2006 Paul Meijer did not drive a racing car because sponsors could not be interested.

For 2007, AR Motorsport invited Paul to test their cars. After being absent on the tracks for almost 2,5 years Paul still is very fast and within ten minutes he has pole-position again in the training. Reason enough for teamchef Ronald Heiligers to interest Marius Ritskes (Antonov Transmissions) to invite Paul for the last three race weekends in the North European Championship of Formula Renault 2.0. (NEC)  He won 2 out of six races and finished second in the other 4 races.

Ritskes also arranged a test in the Lamborghini Gallardo  in Spain with the team of Hans Reiter. After 40 laps the teams calls him in with applause.

In 2008 Meijer has been asked to drive for several teams as a guest driver. The Dutch team MP Motorsport has been offered a wildcard in the Eurocup Formule Renault 2.0. They invited Paul to be there driver. Paul had no experience with the team but accepted the offer. Within a very competitive field of 48 young race drivers he won the race on Sunday, 4 May.

Superleague Formula

When Peter Zakowsky's driver of the Borussia Dortmund car suddenly did not show up during the Superleague Formula races in Zolder, Paul was asked to do the job through mediation of Tom Coronel. This was his chance to show what he was capable of in the top league of autosport (750 hp). He never drove a car with this kind of power so it was quite a challenge. The question was popped on Thursday, on Friday the seat was made and on Saturday he got 2 times 30 minutes to train in the car. After that he started qualifying, which includes 2 semi finals shoot-outs and a final. Paul amazed the team and the organization to get the pole-position, leaving ex Formula One drivers with nothing. At a rainy track he finished third.

As a rookie driver he made quite a debut in this field. Al Ain selected Paul and offered him a seat for the last three weekends in Estoril, Vallelunga and Jerez. In Estoril he won the second race. Unfortunately the season ended to soon, caused by crash during the first practise in Vallelunga, where Paul broke his hand.

Superleague Formula results
(key)

† - Team standings.

External links
 Website of Paul Meijer

1985 births
Living people
Dutch racing drivers
Dutch Formula Renault 2.0 drivers
Formula Renault Eurocup drivers
Formula Renault 2.0 NEC drivers
Sportspeople from Utrecht (city)
Superleague Formula drivers
MP Motorsport drivers
Alan Docking Racing drivers
Van Amersfoort Racing drivers
German Formula Renault 2.0 drivers
GT4 European Series drivers